Hydrodynastes is a small genus of large colubrid snakes in the subfamily Dipsadinae. The genus is endemic to South America.

Species
Two species are recognized.

Hydrodynastes bicinctus (Herrmann, 1804)
Hydrodynastes gigas (A.M.C. Duméril, Bibron & A.H.A. Duméril, 1854)

References

Further reading
Fitzinger L (1843). Systema Reptilium, Fasciculus Primus, Amblyglossae. Vienna: Braumüller & Seidel. 106 pp. + indices. (Genus Hydrodynastes, new genus, p. 25). (in Latin).
Franco FL, Fernandes DS, Bentim BM (2007). "A new species of Hydrodynastes Fitzinger, 1843 from central Brazil (Serpentes: Colubridae: Xenodontidae)". Zootaxa 1613: 57–65. (Hydrodynastes melanogigas, new species).

Hydrodynastes
Snake genera
Taxa named by Leopold Fitzinger